Rotown is a music venue and a bar-restaurant in Rotterdam, Netherlands. It is located close to the city centre, on the Nieuwe Binnenweg.

It is housed in a former Chinese restaurant and has been, although a small one, Rotterdam's main venue for rock and indie music concerts after the demise of Nighttown.

External links
Rotown (official website)

Music venues in the Netherlands
Buildings and structures in Rotterdam
Culture in Rotterdam